Charles Taylor most often refers to:
Charles Taylor (Liberian politician) (born 1948), warlord and 22nd president of Liberia
Charles Taylor (philosopher) (born 1931), Canadian philosopher and social theorist

Charles, Charlie, or Chuck Taylor may also refer to:

Actors, comedians, and theatrical professionals
Charles Taylor (actor), American actor
Charles H. Taylor (lyricist) (1859–1907), British lyricist
Charles "Rip" Taylor (1935–2019), American actor and comedian
Charles W. Taylor (1800–1874), American actor and dramatist

Journalists
Charles H. Taylor (publisher) (1846–1921), American newspaper publisher and politician
Charles P. B. Taylor (1935–1997), Canadian journalist, author, and horsebreeder
Chuck Taylor (journalist, born 1957), American journalist
Chuck Taylor (music journalist) (born 1962), American music journalist

Politicians
Charles Taylor (Australian politician) (1861–1944), member of the Queensland Legislative Assembly
Charles Taylor (Conservative politician) (1910–1989), English politician and MP for Eastbourne
Charles Taylor (MP for Totnes) (1693–1766), English politician
Charles Taylor (North Carolina politician) (born 1941), former US congressman from North Carolina
 Charles E. Taylor (politician), member of the Montana State Senate
 Charles H. Taylor (Michigan politician) (1813–1889), American politician who served as the Michigan Secretary of State
Charles H. Taylor (publisher) (1846–1921), American newspaper publisher and politician
Charles John Taylor (1826–1897), New Zealand politician
Charles Keith Taylor (born 1931), Canadian politician
Charles Simeon Taylor (1851–1913), Wisconsin politician
Charles Wiley Taylor (1786–1865), Connecticut politician

Scholars
Charles Taylor (Hebraist) (1840–1908), English Hebraist
Charles Taylor (physicist) (1922–2002), British physicist
Charles E. Taylor (engineer) (1924–2017), American engineer
Charles Richard Taylor (1939–1995), American biologist
Charles V. Taylor (1918–2009), Australian linguist
Charles Vincent Taylor (1885–1946), American biologist

Sportspeople

American football players and coaches
Charles F. Taylor or Rick Taylor (born 1941), American college football coach and athletic director
Charley Taylor (1941–2022), American professional football player
Chuck Taylor (American football) (1920–1994), American college football player, coach, and administrator

Association football players
Charles Asampong Taylor (born 1981), Ghanaian football player
Charlie Taylor (footballer, born 1985), English footballer
Charlie Taylor (footballer, born 1993), English footballer

Cricketers
Charles Taylor (cricketer, born 1816) (1816–1869), English cricketer
Charles Taylor (cricketer, born 1881) (1881–1960), English cricketer
Charles Taylor (cricketer, born 1966), English former cricketer
Charlie Taylor (cricketer) (1918–2000), Barbadian cricketer

Other sportspeople
Charles Taylor (rugby union) (1863–1915), Welsh rugby union international player
Charles "Bud" Taylor (1903–1962), American boxer
Charles Isham Taylor (1875–1922), American baseball player and manager and co-founder of the Negro National League
Charlie Taylor (footballer, born 1878) (1878–1960), Australian rules footballer for Melbourne, Carlton, and St Kilda
Charlie Taylor (footballer, born 1884) (1884–1953), Australian rules footballer for Fitzroy
Charlie Taylor (rugby league) (1921–2013), English rugby league footballer
Chuck Taylor (baseball) (1942–2018), American baseball player
Chuck Taylor (salesman) (1901–1969), American basketball player and shoe salesman
Chuck Taylor (wrestler) (born 1986), American professional wrestler

Others
Charles McArther Emmanuel or Chuckie Taylor (born 1978), Liberian paramilitary leader and son of Liberian president Charles Taylor
Charles Frederick Taylor (1840–1863), American soldier and Union Army colonel killed in action at the Battle of Gettysburg
Charles Taylor (calico printer and dyer) (died 1816), English businessman, pioneer of textiles bleaching with chlorine
Charles Taylor (cavalryman) (1840–1899), American cavalryman
Charles Taylor (engraver) (1756–1823), English engraver
Charlie Taylor (mechanic) (1868–1956), American mechanic for the Wright brothers, built the first aircraft engine
Charles Taylor (priest) (born 1953), English Anglican priest
Charles Taylor Jr. (born 1943), American author
Charles Carroll Taylor (1917–1945), American pilot, leader of ill-fated Flight 19
Charles L. Taylor (died 1922), American industrialist and friend of Andrew Carnegie
Charles William Gray Taylor (1879–1950), Scottish Presbyterian minister

See also
Charles Benjamin Tayler (1797–1875), English Anglican priest and writer
Myron Charles Taylor (1874–1959), American industrialist and diplomat
Charles Chatworthy Wood Taylor (1792–1856), painter, engineer, mariner, and military officer